The Libu (also transcribed Rebu, Lebu, Lbou, Libou) were an Ancient Libyan tribe of Berber origin, from which the name Libya derives.

Early history

Their occupation of Ancient Libya is first attested in Egyptian language texts from the New Kingdom, especially from the Ramesside Period. The earliest occurrence is in a Ramesses II inscription. There were no vowels in the Egyptian script. The name Libu is written as rbw in Egyptian hieroglyphs. In the Great Karnak Inscription Merneptah describes how hostilities between Egypt and Libya broke out in his regnal year 5 (1208 BCE) and how a coalition of Libu and Sea Peoples led by the chief called king of the Libu Meryey was defeated. Libu appears as an ethnic name on the Merneptah Stele, also known as the Israel Stele.
but the constant describing of Meryey as king implies the they were some type of kingdom but we can't be sure, but some historians suggest that the bronze swords that they used are from Europe. 

Ramesses III defeated the Libyans in the 5th year of his reign, but six years later the Libyans joined the Meshwesh and invaded the western Delta and were defeated again.

This name Libu was taken over by the Greeks of Cyrenaica, who co-existed with them. Geographically, the name of this tribe was adopted by the Greeks for "Cyrenaica" as well as for northwestern Africa in general.

In the neo-Punic inscriptions, Libu was written as Lby for the masculine noun, and Lbt for the feminine noun of Libyan. The name supposedly was used as an ethnic name in those inscriptions.

Great Chiefs of the Libu
In the Western Nile Delta, some time during the 22nd Dynasty of Egypt flourished a realm of the Libu led by "Great Chiefs of the Libu". Those rulers soon formed a dynasty, and they often had local "Chiefs of the Ma(shuash)" as their subordinates. The dynasty culminated with the chiefdom of Tefnakht who, despite holding both the titles of "Great Chief of the Libu" and of "Chief of the Ma" at Sais, was more probably of Egyptian ethnicity rather than either Libu or Ma. Later, Tefnakht claimed for himself even the pharaonic titles, founding the 24th Dynasty.

Here follows the succession of the known "Great Chiefs of the Libu". They used to date their monuments following the regnal years of the contemporary pharaoh of the 22nd Dynasty.

See also
Ancient Egypt
Ancient Libya
Garamantes
Meshwesh

References

Ancient peoples of Africa
Berber peoples and tribes
Sea Peoples
Wars involving ancient Egypt
Ancient Libya
Countries in ancient Africa
Egypt–Libya relations
Ancient Libyans